The Committee for Ethnic Minority Affairs is a ministry-level agency in Vietnam that exercises the functions of state management on ethnic minority affairs nationwide. The Committee is headed by a Chief. The current Chief of the Committee for Ethnic Minority Affairs is Hầu A Lềnh.

Departments
 Department of Policies on Ethnic Minority
 Department of Ethnic Minority Affairs for the Northwest Region (Local Affairs Department I)
 Department of Ethnic Minority Affairs for the Central Highlands (Local Affairs Department II)
 Department of Ethnic Minority Affairs for the Mekong Delta (Local Affairs Department III)
 Department of Propaganda
 Department of Ethnic Minorities
 Department of General Affairs
 Department of Legal Affairs
 Department of International Cooperation
 Department of Organisation and Personnel
 Department of Finance and Planning
 Committee Inspectorate
 Committee Office
 Institute for Ethnic Minority Affairs
 Training Institution for Ethnic Minority Officials
 Information Centre
 Ethnicity Magazine
 Ethnicity and Development Newspaper

External links
 Official site

Government ministries of Vietnam
Government of Vietnam
Governmental office in Hanoi